Adenoid hypertrophy (enlarged adenoids) is the unusual growth (hypertrophy) of the adenoid (pharyngeal tonsil) first described in 1868 by the Danish physician Wilhelm Meyer (1824–1895) in Copenhagen. He described a long term adenoid hypertrophy that will cause an obstruction of the nasal airways. These will lead to a dentofacial growth anomaly that was defined as "adenoid facies" (see long face syndrome).

There is very little lymphoid tissue in the nasopharynx of young babies; humans are born without substantial adenoids. The mat of lymphoid tissue called adenoids starts to get sizable during the first year of life. Just how big the adenoids become is quite variable between individual children.

Signs and symptoms

Enlarged adenoids can become nearly the size of a ping pong ball and completely block airflow through the nasal passages. Even if enlarged adenoids are not substantial enough to physically block the back of the nose, they can obstruct airflow enough so that nasal breathing requires an uncomfortable amount of work, and inhalation occurs instead through mouth breathing. Adenoids can also obstruct the nasal airway enough to affect the voice without actually stopping nasal airflow altogether.

Nasal blockage is determined by at least two factors: 1) the size of the adenoids, and 2) the size of the nasal pharynx passageway.
The adenoid usually reaches its greatest size by about age 5 years or so, and then fades away ("atrophies") by late childhood - generally by the age of 7 years. The lymphoid tissue remains under the mucosa of the nasopharynx, and could be seen under a microscope if the area was biopsied, but the mass is so reduced in size that the roof of the nasopharynx becomes flat rather than mounded. Just as the size of the adenoids is variable between individuals, so is the age at which adenoids atrophy.

The symptoms caused by enlarged adenoids are mostly due to where this lymphoid tissue is located. The adenoids are in the midline of the nasopharynx, and the Eustachian tubes open from either ear to the right and left of them. In children with excessive middle ear infections and chronic middle ear fluid, there is a high bacterial count in the adenoids as compared to children without problematic otitis media, even if the size of the adenoids is small. The adenoids in these cases provide a reservoir of pathogenic bacteria that cause ear infections and subsequent middle ear effusions (fluid).

The nasopharynx lies directly above the throat. Splashes of excessive "drip" from infected adenoids may fall directly onto the vocal cords. Although the larynx and vocal cords do not ordinarily become infected from adenoiditis, their mucosa does become irritated. The vocal cords are extremely sensitive to touch, and any fluid drops falling on them cause an irresistible urge to cough. Adenoiditis therefore is one of the causes of cough.

Causes
The adenoids, like all lymphoid tissue, enlarge when infected. Although lymphoid tissue does act to fight infection, sometimes bacteria and viruses can lodge within it and survive. Chronic infection, either viral or bacterial, can keep the pad of adenoids enlarged for years, even into adulthood. Some viruses, such as the Epstein–Barr virus, can cause dramatic enlargement of lymphoid tissue. Primary or reactivation infections with Epstein–Barr virus, and certain other bacteria and viruses, can even cause enlargement of the adenoidal pad in an adult whose adenoids had previously become atrophied.

Diagnosis

 Posterior rhinoscopy: was used in earlier times; the postnasal space is visualized using a posterior rhinoscopy mirror.
 Diagnostic nasal endoscopy: A rigid or a flexible nasopharyngoscope can help to see details in a cooperative child.
 Computed tomography scan of nasopharynx
 X-ray lateral view of nasopharynx

Detailed nasal examination should always be done to exclude other causes of nasal obstruction.

Treatment
There is some low-quality evidence suggesting that mometasone may lead to symptomatic improvement in children with adenoid hypertrophy.

Surgical removal of the adenoids is a procedure called adenoidectomy. Carried out through the mouth under a general anaesthetic, adenoidectomy involves the adenoids being curetted, cauterised, lasered, or otherwise ablated. Adenoidectomy is most often performed because of nasal obstruction, but is also performed to reduce middle ear infections and fluid (otitis media). The procedure is often carried out at the same time as a tonsillectomy, since the adenoids can be clearly seen and assessed by the surgeon at that time.

Additional reading
 
 
BUPA Health Fact Sheet. "Adenoidectomy"

References

External links 

Mouth
Tonsil disorders
Gross pathology
Otorhinolaryngology